The sixth season of the American animated television series SpongeBob SquarePants, created by former marine biologist and animator Stephen Hillenburg, aired on Nickelodeon from March 3, 2008, to July 5, 2010, and contained 26 half-hour episodes, being the first season with a different number of half-hours. The series chronicles the exploits and adventures of the title character and his various friends in the fictional underwater city of Bikini Bottom. The season was executive produced by series creator Hillenburg and supervising producer  Paul Tibbitt, who also acted as the showrunner. In 2009, the show celebrated its tenth anniversary on television. The documentary film titled Square Roots: The Story of SpongeBob SquarePants premiered on July 17, 2009, and marked the anniversary. SpongeBob's Truth or Square, a television film, and the special episode "To SquarePants or Not to SquarePants" were broadcast on Nickelodeon, as part of the celebration.

The show itself received several recognition, including the Kids' Choice Awards for Favorite Cartoon in 2009 and 2010. At the 2009 ASTRA Awards, the show was nominated for the Favourite International Program category, but did not win. At the 37th Daytime Emmy Awards, the show won for Outstanding Special Class Animated Program, while the directors of the show were nominated for Outstanding Directing in an Animated Program. The show was also nominated at the 2009 and 2010 BAFTA Children's Awards for the Kids' Vote – Television and International category, respectively. The episode "SpongeBob vs. The Big One" was nominated at the 2010 Golden Reel Awards. At the 37th Annie Awards, SpongeBob SquarePants was nominated for Best Animated Television Production for Children, while Tom Kenny won Best Voice Acting in a Television Production for his work on SpongeBob's Truth or Square. Furthermore, at the 38th Annie Awards, the show won for Best Animated Television Production for Children, while the crew members, Jeremy Wakefield, Sage Guyton, Nick Carr, and Tuck Tucker, won the Music in a Television Production category. SpongeBob SquarePants also won at the 2011 ASCAP Film and Television Awards for Top Television Series. The episode "Dear Vikings" was nominated at the 61st Primetime Emmy Awards for Outstanding Special Class - Short-Format Animated Programs. Furthermore, Alan Smart was also nominated at the 36th Annie Awards for Direction in an Animated Television Production or Short-form for "Penny Foolish".

Several compilation DVDs that contained episodes from the season were released. The SpongeBob SquarePants: Season 6, Volume 1 and 2 DVDs were released in Region 1 on December 8, 2009, and December 7, 2010, respectively, while the complete set was released in Region 2 on November 29, 2010, and Region 4 on December 2, 2010. On November 13, 2012, The Complete Sixth Season DVD was released in Region 1.

Production
The season aired on Nickelodeon, which is owned by Viacom, and was produced by United Plankton Pictures and Nickelodeon Animation Studio. The season's executive producers were series creator Stephen Hillenburg and Paul Tibbitt, who also acted as the series' showrunner. Upon the announcement of Nickelodeon signing the new show The Mighty B! on December 12, 2006, it renewed SpongeBob SquarePants for a sixth season with 26 episodes in order, surpassing the 100-episode mark. Cyma Zarghami, president of Nickelodeon, said "One of the great things about animation is that you can play it over and over again, and kids will still watch it [...] With live action they won't." On March 3, 2008, the season premiered with the episode "Krabby Road". It was written by Luke Brookshier, Nate Cash, and Eric Shaw, while Alan Smart served as animation director.

In 2009, Nickelodeon began celebrating the tenth anniversary of the show with Square Roots: The Story of SpongeBob SquarePants, a documentary special by filmmaker Patrick Creadon, that discusses the history of the show and the ascent of the "absorbing character's journey to pop culture stardom". Creator Stephen Hillenburg, speaking by phone from Southern California, said "Ten years. I never imagined working on the show to this date and this long. I really figured we might get a season and a cult following, and that might be it." In an interview, Tom Kenny told that "What I'm most proud of is that kids still really like it and care about it [...] They eagerly await new episodes. People who were young children when it started 10 years ago are still watching it and digging it and think it's funny. That's the loving cup for me."

Nickelodeon also broadcast a 50 ½-hour television marathon titled "The Ultimate SpongeBob SpongeBash Weekend". The marathon featured the ten most memorable episodes as picked by its viewers on Nick.com. The night capped off with the television encore of The SpongeBob SquarePants Movie at 8 PM. On July 19, ten new episodes including the special episode "To SquarePants or Not to SquarePants" premiered. Paramount Home Entertainment released a 14-disc DVD titled The First 100 Episodes on September 22, 2009. The DVD runs approximately 2200 minutes and includes the first 100 episodes of the series. A second SpongeBob SquarePants television film, titled Truth or Square, aired on Nickelodeon on November 6, 2009. Several celebrities made live action cameo appearances on the film, including Rosario Dawson, LeBron James, Tina Fey, Will Ferrell, Craig Ferguson, Robin Williams and P!nk, while Ricky Gervais provided opening and closing narration for the film.

Animation was handled overseas in South Korea at Rough Draft Studios. Animation directors credited with episodes in the sixth season included Andrew Overtoom, Alan Smart, and Tom Yasumi. Episodes were written by a team of writers, which consisted of Casey Alexander, Steven Banks, Luke Brookshier, Nate Cash, Zeus Cervas, Sean Charmatz, Derek Iversen, Tom King, Dani Michaeli, Richard Pursel, Chris Reccardi, Aaron Springer, Eric Shaw, and Paul Tibbitt. The season was storyboarded by Alexander, Brookshier, Cash, Cervas, Charmatz, King, Reccardi, and Springer.

Cast

The sixth season featured Tom Kenny as the voice of the title character SpongeBob SquarePants and his pet snail Gary. SpongeBob's best friend, a starfish named Patrick Star, was voiced by Bill Fagerbakke, while Rodger Bumpass played the voice of Squidward Tentacles, an arrogant and ill-tempered squid. Other members of the cast were Clancy Brown as Mr. Krabs, a miserly crab obsessed with money and SpongeBob's boss at the Krusty Krab; Mr. Lawrence as Plankton, a small green copepod and Mr. Krabs' business rival; Jill Talley as Karen, Plankton's sentient computer sidekick; Carolyn Lawrence as Sandy Cheeks, a squirrel from Texas; Mary Jo Catlett as Mrs. Puff, SpongeBob's boating school teacher; and Lori Alan as Pearl, a teenage whale who is Mr. Krabs' daughter.

In addition to the regular cast members, episodes feature guest voices from many ranges of professions, including actors, athletes, authors, musicians, and artists.  For instance, in the episode "House Fancy", television personality Alton Brown guest starred as the character of Nicholas Whithers, the host and judge of a show of the same name. In an interview, Brown described the work as "a blast." He said "I came up with this voice that didn't sound anything like me. I channeled this very strange person. Only three people I know figured out it was even me when they saw it." Actor and musician Johnny Depp guest starred in the episode "SpongeBob SquarePants vs. The Big One" as the voice of Jack Kahuna Laguna, a surf guru that taught SpongeBob how to surf. According to Sarah Noonan, vice president of talent and casting for Nickelodeon, Depp accepted the role because he and his kids were fans of the show. The episode was also guest starred by musician and The Monkees' Davy Jones who starred in the episode as himself, appearing at the bottom of the sea with his locker, and Bruce Brown providing vocal cameo as the episode's narrator. Brian Doyle-Murray also reprised his role as the Flying Dutchman for the episode. In "The Card", Ernest Borgnine returned, reprising his role as Mermaid Man. Borgnine later reappeared in the episodes "Ditchin'" and "Shuffleboarding", voicing his recurring role, with Tim Conway as Barnacle Boy. In "Dear Vikings", English actor Ian McShane voiced Gordon, the leader of the large group of Vikings outside of Bikini Bottom. Dennis Quaid also appeared in the "Grandpappy the Pirate" as Grandpa Redbeard, Mr. Krabs' grandfather. Furthermore, Dee Snider, the frontman of the heavy metal band Twisted Sister, guest starred in "Shell Shocked" as Angry Jack. Snider said "I knew they must be fans [of mine] because in the SpongeBob movie, they took my song 'I Wanna Rock' and changed it to 'Goofy Goober Rock.' I flipped at the opportunity to be in the show. I have four kids, and everybody loved SpongeBob." In the entry "The Clash of Triton", English singer Victoria Beckham guest starred in the episode as the wife of King Neptune, Queen Amphitrite. The writers created the role of a Queen Amphitrite especially for Beckham. The former Spice Girl accepted the role because her sons, Brooklyn, Romeo, and Cruz, love the show, were excited when their mother told them of the role, and looked forward to watching the episode with her. Beckham recorded the voice-over in late-2008 in a day, and claimed that she was "thrilled" to provide the vocal cameo. Other guests in the episode included Seinfeld actor John O'Hurley as King Neptune and Skid Row heavy metal vocalist Sebastian Bach as the voice of Triton.

Moreover, in the television film SpongeBob's Truth or Square, various celebrities guest appeared, including Rosario Dawson, Craig Ferguson, Will Ferrell, Tina Fey, LeBron James, Triumph the Insult Comic Dog, and Robin Williams as guest actors appearing as themselves in the live action sequences, while Ricky Gervais provided vocal cameo as the narrator.

Reception
The show itself received several awards and nominations for its sixth season, including the Kids' Choice Awards for Favorite Cartoon in 2009 and 2010. SpongeBob SquarePants won the 2009 and 2010 Indonesia Kids' Choice Awards for Favorite Cartoon, while being nominated at the 2010 Kids' Choice Awards Mexico for the same category. At the 2009 ASTRA Awards, the show was nominated for the Favourite International Program category, but did not win. The show itself received several recognition, including the Kids' Choice Awards for Favorite Cartoon in 2009 and 2010. The series was nominated for the award in 2008, but lost to Avatar: The Last Airbender. The series also won the same category at the Philippines Kids' Choice Awards and Indonesia Kids' Choice Awards, held in 2008 and 2009, respectively. At the 2009 ASTRA Awards, the show was nominated for the Favourite International Program category. Furthermore, the show won the Choice TV Animated Show category at the 2009 Teen Choice Awards. At the 37th Daytime Emmy Awards, the show won for Outstanding Special Class Animated Program, while the directors, including Andrea Romano, Tom Yasumi, Andrew Overtoom and Alan Smart, were nominated for Outstanding Directing in an Animated Program. Alan Smart was also nominated at the 36th Annie Awards for Direction in an Animated Television Production or Short-form for "Penny Foolish". "Suction Cup Symphony" received a nomination at the 2009 Golden Reel Awards for Best Sound Editing: Television Animation.  The episode "SpongeBob SquarePants vs. The Big One" was nominated at the 2010 Golden Reel Awards. At the 2009 and 2010 BAFTA Children's Awards, the show was nominated for the Kids' Vote – Television and International category, respectively. In 2010, the "SpongeBob vs. The Big One" DVD won the Best Home Entertainment Production category. The DVD release of the episode was nominated at the 37th Annie Awards for Best Home Entertainment Production. At the same award body, SpongeBob SquarePants was nominated for Best Animated Television Production for Children, while Tom Kenny won Best Voice Acting in a Television Production for his work on the television film SpongeBob's Truth or Square as SpongeBob SquarePants. Furthermore, at the 38th Annie Awards, the show won for Best Animated Television Production for Children, while the crew members, Jeremy Wakefield, Sage Guyton, Nick Carr and Tuck Tucker, won the Music in a Television Production category. SpongeBob SquarePants also won at the 2011 ASCAP Film and Television Awards for Top Television Series. At the 2010 and 2011 TP de Oro, the series won the Best Children and Youth Program category. Sarah Noonan has been nominated for two Artios Awards of the Casting Society of America, out of which she won for Television Animation. "Dear Vikings" was nominated at the 61st Primetime Emmy Awards for Outstanding Special Class - Short-Format Animated Programs; however, it had no winner as the nominees neither received the necessary 50 percent support.

The season received mixed to positive reviews from media critics. In a DVD review, Paul Mavis of DVD Talk "highly recommended" the set, saying "[The season has a shaky start], but the laughs definitely pick up on the second disc." In particular, Mavis praised the episode "The Splinter" as "one of the very best SpongeBob [episodes]," while "Slide Whistle Stooges", "Boating Buddies", and "The Slumber Party" were described by Mavis as "SpongeBob season's best offerings." In a separate review for the "Volume 2" DVD, Mavis only "recommended" it. He said that the episodes, including "Choir Boys", "Pet or Pests", "Overbooked", "Shell Shocked", "Komputer Overload", "Chum Bucket Supreme", and "Single Cell Anniversary" are "solid entries" and "all deliver steady laughs," but has doubts that "they're on a par with series' best entries like 'The Splinter', 'Slide Whistle Stooges', 'Boating Buddies', and 'The Slumber Party'."

In a DVD review for the individual episode DVD release Spongicus, Roy Hrab of DVD Verdict gave this season a negative review and said that "In my previous SpongeBob reviews I have commented that series has lost its edge. This offering does nothing to change my opinion. But what the heck do I know? Clearly, the show continues to maintain a large following and the franchise is a license to print money for Nickelodeon." The DVD consists of eight episodes and praised the episodes "Not Normal" and "Gone" by describing them "the best episode on the disc" and "a decent episode", respectively. Also from DVD Verdict, Gordon Sullivan, on the DVD release To SquarePants or Not to SquarePants, said that "[it is] a solid collection of SpongeBob SquarePants episodes." He added that "My only serious problem with this set is that it's only eight episodes long; a more complete season-style release would be more efficient. On the technical front everything is fine, with the bright, solid colors of Bikini Bottom shining through clearly and all the dialogue and effects clear and detailed." Sullivan gave the episodes "The Splinter", "Slide Whistle Stooges", and "The Krabby Kronicle" an 8/10 rating, while "Boating Buddies" received the lowest rating with 3/10.

Episodes 

The episodes are ordered below according to Nickelodeon's packaging order, and not their original production or broadcast order.

DVD release
The first 24 segment episodes of the sixth season were released on DVD by Paramount Home Entertainment in the United States and Canada on December 8, 2009. The "Volume 1" DVD release features bonus material including animated shorts. The remaining 23 segment episodes were also released under the title "Volume 2" in the United States and Canada on December 7, 2010. The DVD release also features bonus material including music videos, shorts and featurettes. In Region 2 and 4, the DVD release for the season was a complete set. On November 13, 2012, The Complete Sixth Season DVD was released in Region 1, two years after the season had completed broadcast on television.

Notes

References

External links

Season 6 at IMDb
Season 6 at Metacritic

2008 American television seasons
2009 American television seasons
2010 American television seasons
SpongeBob SquarePants seasons